Mystery Road is an Australian television crime mystery series whose first series screened on ABC TV from 3 June 2018. The series is a spin-off from Ivan Sen's feature films Mystery Road and Goldstone, taking place in between the two. Aboriginal Australian detective Jay Swan, played by Aaron Pedersen, is the main character and actor in both the films and in the first two TV series, each of six episodes.

Series 1 was directed by Rachel Perkins. Swan is brought in to solve a murder, with the local police officer played by Judy Davis. In Series 2, directed by Warwick Thornton and Wayne Blair, which began airing on ABC on 19 April 2020, Swan is brought in to solve a murder in a different location, with the "local copper" this time played by Jada Alberts. Both series were shot in northern Western Australia.

Series 3, directed by Dylan River, is a prequel set in 1999, titled Mystery Road: Origin. Mark Coles Smith plays a younger version of Swan.

Plot

Series 1
Taking place between the events of the films Mystery Road and Goldstone, Mystery Road Series 1 tells the story of Detective Jay Swan (Aaron Pedersen), assigned to investigate the mysterious disappearance of two young farmhands on an outback cattle station, one a local Indigenous football hero and the other a white backpacker. Working together with local police sergeant Emma James (Judy Davis), the investigation uncovers drug trafficking in the town, and a past injustice that threatens the fabric of the whole community.

Series 2
Jay Swan has to unravel the mystery of a decapitated body which turns up in the mangroves, outside the town of Broome. The plot involves drug trafficking and an archaeological dig which discovered the dead body. Swan's ex Mary is involved with an undercover drug runner, placing her in extreme danger.

Series 3
The year is 1999, and a young Jay Swan moves back to his home town of Jardine to join the local police force. He must cope with his estranged father Jack and his feelings for local girl Mary Allen, as well as contending with a mysterious gang of robbers.

Cast
 Aaron Pedersen (Series 1-2) and Mark Coles Smith (Series 3) as Jay Swan
 Tasma Walton (Series 1-2) and Tuuli Narkle (Series 3) as Mary Swan, née Allen
 Tasia Zalar as Shevorne Shields (Series 1-2)

Series 1
 Judy Davis as Emma James
 Wayne Blair as Larry Dime
 Aaron McGrath as Marley Thompson
 Deborah Mailman as Kerry Thompson
 Madeleine Madden as Crystal Swan
 Meyne Wyatt as Cedric Thompson
 Colin Friels as Tony Ballantyne
 Rohan Mirchandaney as David Sharma
 Anthony Hayes as Ryan Muller
 Ernie Dingo as Keith Groves
 John Waters as Travis James
 Kris McQuade as Liz Rutherford
 Ningali Lawford Wolf as Dot
 Connor Van Vuuren as Reese Dale
 Ben Oxenbould as Vince Pearce
 Benjamin Hoetjes as Eric Hoffman
 Jessica Falkholt as Genevieve Leclaire

Series 2
 Jada Alberts as Fran Davis
 Callan Mulvey as Simon
 Rob Collins as Amos
 Gary Sweet as Alkemi
 Ursula Yovich as Pansy
 Sofia Helin as Sandra Elmquist
 Ngaire Pigram as Leonie
 Mark Mitchinson as Owen
 Stan Yarramunua as Jimmy 2
 Rhimi Johnson as Phillip 
 Keith Robinson as Reverend Tom
 Fletcher Humphrys as Dylan Lindwall
 Kirk Page as Suzi-John
 Eve Morey as Kayla
 John Brumpton as Hegarty
 Joel Jackson as McBride
 Simon Lyndon as Emilio Gordon

Series 3: Mystery Road: Origin
 Mark Coles Smith as Jay Swan
 Toby Leonard Moore as Abe
 Daniel Henshall as Patrick
 Lisa Flanagan as Catherine
 Clarence Ryan as Sputty
 Steve Bisley as Peter Lovric
 Caroline Brazier as Geraldine
 Hayley McElhinney as Max 
 Serene Yunupingu as Lartesha
 Kelton Pell as Jack Swan
 Leonie Whyman as Cissy
 Salme Geransar as Anousha
 Nina Young as Fiona
 Jayden Popik as Xavier
 Grace Chow as Cindy
 Megan Wilding as Ziggy
 Tuuli Narkle as Mary Allen

Episodes

Series 1 (2018)

Series 2 (2020)
Series 2 began screening on ABC in April 2020. It had its world premiere at the 70th Berlin International Film Festival in late February, in the new Series section devoted to longform television series, along with another ABC series, Stateless.

Series 3 (2022)

Mystery Road: Origin went to air on Sunday 3 July 2022 and runs until 7 August. All six episodes were made available on iview. The writers include Blake Ayshford, Steven McGregor, Kodie Bedford, Timothy Lee and Dylan River.

Productions

Filming 
Series 1
The first series was made on location in and around Wyndham, a town in northern Western Australia. Other scenes were shot at Kununurra and on Aboriginal lands belonging to the Miriuwung, Gajerrong and Balanggarra in the Kimberley. Location shooting took approximately 10 weeks.

Series 2
The second series was filmed in Broome, and in the Kimberley in northern Western Australia, taking 10 weeks. It was Thornton's first time directing for television, and he said that Blair's experience in this medium was vital. He also said that Sen and Perkins had done the hard work creating "this unique world", which gave the directors of Series 2 a strong foundation, so they could focus on the performances.

Series 3

Mystery Road: Origin was also filmed in WA, around Kalgoorlie, Boulder and Coolgardie.

Reception

Critical reception 
Series 1

Series 2
The Guardian reviewer Luke Buckmaster praised the "extraordinary breadth" of the show, in the way it portrays the country "only just beginning to come to terms with its past". He praised Pedersen’s performance, which "simultaneously [projects] great strength and great sorrow", as a man "caught between traditions, between worldviews, between laws and lores".

Series 3
In The Sydney Morning Herald, Kylie Northover gave Mystery Road: Origin a rating of five stars, while The Guardian gave it four (out of five).

Awards and nominations

Series 1-2

Mystery Road: Origin

Home media

References

External links

2010s Australian drama television series
2018 Australian television series debuts
English-language television shows
Australian Broadcasting Corporation original programming
Television shows set in Western Australia
Television shows set in the Outback
2010s Australian crime television series
2020s Australian drama television series
2020s Australian crime television series
Neo-Western television series